Aristochroa is a genus of beetles in the family Carabidae, containing the following species:

 Aristochroa aba Tian, 2004
 Aristochroa abrupta Kavanaugh & Liang, 2003
 Aristochroa balangensis Xie & Yu, 1993
 Aristochroa casta Tschitscherine, 1898
 Aristochroa chuanxiensis Tian, 2004
 Aristochroa deqinensis Xie & Yu, 1993
 Aristochroa deuvi Xia & Yo, 1993
 Aristochroa dimorpha Zamotajlov & Fedorenko, 2000
 Aristochroa exochopleurae Kavanaugh & Liang, 2006
 Aristochroa freyi Straneo, 1938
 Aristochroa gratiosa Tschitscherine, 1898
 Aristochroa kangdingensis Zamotajlov & Fedorenko, 2000
 Aristochroa kaznakovi Tschitscherine, 1903
 Aristochroa lama Tian, 2004
 Aristochroa lanpingensis Tian, 2004
 Aristochroa latecostata Fairmaire, 1887
 Aristochroa longiphallus Tian, 2004
 Aristochroa militaris Sciaky & Wrase, 1997
 Aristochroa morvani Tian, 2004
 Aristochroa mosuo Tian, 2004
 Aristochroa panda Tian, 2004
 Aristochroa perelegans Tschitscherine, 1898
 Aristochroa sciakyi Zamotajlov & Fedorenko, 2000
 Aristochroa splendida Kavanaugh & Liang, 2006
 Aristochroa venusta Tschitscherine, 1898
 Aristochroa venustoides Xie & Yu, 1993
 Aristochroa wangi Xie & Yo, 1993
 Aristochroa watanabei Ito & Imura, 2005
 Aristochroa yuae Kavanaugh & Liang, 2006
 Aristochroa zhongdianensis Liang & Yu, 2002

References

Pterostichinae